Sokratis Skartsis (born 1936) is a Greek poet and writer, as well as a professor in the University of Patras.  He is also a founding member of the University of Patras Poetry Symposium.  He has published 150 books, including poetry, literature studies, etc.

Works

References
115 Poems - E. E. Cummings, Cummings, E. E. (Edward Estlin), 1999 
Turkish Heroic Chronography, Korkut, Dede 1993  
The first version of the article is translated and is based from the article at the Greek Wikipedia (el:Main Page)

External links
Sokratis Skartsis website

1936 births
Living people
Poets from Achaea
Academic staff of the University of Patras
Place of birth missing (living people)